James "Jim" Daniel Torlakson (born February 19, 1951), is an American artist known for his photorealist oil paintings, watercolors and aquatint intaglio etchings. He is based in the San Francisco Bay Area.

Early life

Born in San Francisco, California on February 19, 1951. Growing up in the Westlake neighborhood of Daly City, Torlakson moved to Pacifica by the sea in 1971 where he has lived since becoming a professional artist. He started drawing at an early age, encouraged by his parents, who entered a drawing of his in the San Francisco Chronicle "Daily Junior Art Champion" when he was six years old; he was awarded first prize.

He was also inspired by artist George Post, a Californian watercolor painter, who was his grandparents' neighbor in Oakland, California. His brother is American politician Tom Torlakson.

He studied general fine arts and received a B.F.A. in 1971 at California College of the Arts, graduating before going onto complete a Masters of Arts in 1975 at San Francisco State University.

Work

Torlakson’s photorealism subject matter and imagery have centered on “every day” America including trucks, railways, amusement parks, waterfronts, fireworks booths, deserted drive-in theaters and coastal landscapes. His oils, watercolors, aquatint etchings and drawings have been exhibited nationally since 1971 within United States and Internationally, with works housed in the permanent collections of many American Museums, including San Francisco Museum of Modern Art, Oakland Museum, Achenbach Foundation for the Graphic Arts, Brooklyn Museum, Carnegie Museum of Art, Rhode Island School of Design Museum; New York Public Library’s print collection, Art Institute of Chicago, Library of Congress, Denver Art Museum and the De Cordova Museum.

He was a professor at City College of San Francisco from 1999 to 2017. Other teaching experience also includes California College of the Arts and Skyline College.

References

Artists from the San Francisco Bay Area
California College of the Arts faculty
City College of San Francisco faculty
1951 births
San Francisco State University alumni
Living people
20th-century American printmakers
California College of the Arts alumni
21st-century American printmakers
20th-century American painters
21st-century American painters
20th-century American male artists
21st-century American male artists
American male painters
Painters from California